Catalan flag may either refer to 

 Senyera, the flag of Catalonia, an autonomous community of Spain
 Estelada, the symbol used by the Catalan independence movement